Glenburn is a town in Penobscot County, Maine, United States. The population was 4,648 at the 2020 census. When originally incorporated in 1822, it was called "Dutton" in honor of Bangor's Samuel Dutton, a judge and founder of the Bangor Theological Seminary. It was renamed the Town of Glenburn on March 18, 1837.

Geography

The two historic centers are the villages of Glenburn and West Glenburn. It is bordered on the north by Hudson, on the east by Old Town, on the south by Orono, on the south by Bangor, on the southwest by Hermon and on the west by Kenduskeag.

Demographics

2010 census
As of the census of 2010, there were 4,594 people, 1,808 households, and 1,300 families residing in the town. The racial makeup of the town was 97.1% White, 0.4% African American, 0.7% Native American, 0.5% Asian, 0.1% from other races, and 1.1% from two or more races. Hispanic or Latino of any race were 0.4% of the population.

There were 1,808 households, of which 33.3% had children under the age of 18 living with them, 58.8% were married couples living together, 8.6% had a female householder with no husband present, 4.5% had a male householder with no wife present, and 28.1% were non-families. 18.9% of all households were made up of individuals, and 6.3% had someone living alone who was 65 years of age or older. The average household size was 2.54 and the average family size was 2.88.

The median age in the town was 41.2 years. 22.1% of residents were under the age of 18; 7.9% were between the ages of 18 and 24; 25.8% were from 25 to 44; 33.6% were from 45 to 64; and 10.5% were 65 years of age or older. The gender makeup of the town was 49.4% male and 50.6% female.

Education

Students in Glenburn attend Glenburn School (K–8).  The town has no high school.  Residents of Glenburn enjoy school choice, which means students can choose where they want to go for high school.

Glenburn School (elementary and middle school) hosts recreation programs, and their school athletic teams are called the Glenburn Chargers.

Military installation
The journalistic organization ProPublica reports that during the mid-twentieth-century a Ground-to-Air Transmitter (GAT) Facility  for the CIM-10 Bomarc system was located in Glenburn, supervised from Dow Air Force Base in Bangor for the Bangor Air Defense Sector.  Situated near to the current town offices, equipment and fuel storage facilities at the site contaminated the local groundwater to a degree that cleanup is expected to extend until the year 2039.

References

External links
Town of Glenburn official website

Towns in Penobscot County, Maine